Bernhard Vogel (19 December 1683 – 13 October 1737) was a German engraver whose main interests were genre scenes and portraits.

Vogel was born in Nürnberg.  He studied under Weigel and Heisse in Augsburg.

In 1745 a number of his engravings after Jan Kupecký were published by the German painter and engraver Valentin Daniel Preissler.

He died in Augsburg, aged 53.

References

External links

1683 births
1737 deaths
German engravers